Top-seeded JoAnne Russell and Virginia Ruzici were the defending champions but they lost in the final to Ivanna Madruga-Osses and Catherine Tanvier.

Seeds
A champion seed is indicated in bold text while text in italics indicates the round in which that seed was eliminated.

Draw

Finals

Top half

Bottom half

References

External links

U.S. Clay Court Championships
1982 U.S. Clay Court Championships